42nd National Board of Review Awards
January 3, 1971
The 42nd National Board of Review Awards were announced on January 3, 1971.

Top Ten Films 
Patton
Kes
Women in Love
Five Easy Pieces
Ryan's Daughter
I Never Sang for My Father
Diary of a Mad Housewife
Love Story
The Virgin and the Gypsy
Tora! Tora! Tora!

Top Foreign Films 
The Wild Child
My Night at Maud's
The Passion of Anna
The Confession
This Man Must Die

Winners 
Best Film:
Patton
Best Foreign Film:
The Wild Child
Best Actor:
George C. Scott - Patton
Best Actress:
Glenda Jackson - Women in Love
Best Supporting Actor:
Frank Langella - Diary of a Mad Housewife, The Twelve Chairs
Best Supporting Actress:
Karen Black - Five Easy Pieces
Best Director:
François Truffaut - The Wild Child

External links 
National Board of Review of Motion Pictures :: Awards for 1970

1970
1970 film awards
1970 in American cinema